Fitzwilliam (or FitzWilliam), lit. "Son of William", is derived from the Anglo-Norman prefix Fitz (pronounced "fits") often used in patronymic surnames of Anglo-Norman origin; that is to say originating in the 11th century (the word is a Norman French noun literally meaning "Son of", from the Latin filius (for 'son'), plus genitive case of the father's forename); and from William, lit. "Willpower/Desire Protector", which is a popular given name of old Germanic origin, becoming very popular in the English language after the Norman conquest of England in 1066, and remained so throughout the Middle Ages and into the modern era).  While more popular as a surname, it does have some popularity as a given name.

"Fitzwilliam"/"FitzWilliam" may also refer to:

Persons
 Richard FitzWilliam, 5th Viscount FitzWilliam (1677–1743), Irish nobleman and politician
 Richard FitzWilliam, 7th Viscount FitzWilliam (1745–1816)
 Thomas Fitzwilliam (disambiguation)
 Wendy Fitzwilliam (b. 1972), Trinidad and Tobago's second Miss Universe
 William Fitzwilliam, 4th Earl Fitzwilliam (1748–1833), British statesman

Fictional characters

Given Name
 Fitzwilliam Darcy, a major character in Jane Austen's novel Pride and Prejudice

Surname
 Claude Fitzwilliam, title character in the 1967 American romantic comedy film Fitzwilly starring Dick Van Dyke, with Barbara Feldon in her first feature-film role.
 Colonel Fitzwilliam, a minor character in Jane Austen's Pride and Prejudice.
 Reggie Fitzwilliam, a character in the television show The Strain.

See also
 Earl Fitzwilliam, a title in the Peerage of Ireland and the Peerage of Great Britain
 Viscount FitzWilliam, a title in the Peerage of Ireland
 Fitzwilliam Virginal Book, source of keyboard music in the Elizabethan and Jacobean periods in England

Norman-language surnames
Patronymic surnames
Surnames from given names